Kirker House, also known as the Daniel and Donna Finell House, is a historic home located at Wellsburg, Brooke County, West Virginia. It was built in 1884 and is a two-story, rectangular brick dwelling in the High Victorian Italianate style. It measures  and has a shallow-pitched hipped roof.

It was listed on the National Register of Historic Places in 1986.

References

Houses on the National Register of Historic Places in West Virginia
Italianate architecture in West Virginia
Victorian architecture in West Virginia
Houses completed in 1884
Houses in Brooke County, West Virginia
National Register of Historic Places in Brooke County, West Virginia